Shang Ping ( (pronounced Shung); born December 23, 1984), also known as Eric Shang, is a Chinese professional basketball player who most recently played for the Tianjin Gold Lions of the Chinese Basketball Association. He is a 2.06 m (6'9") tall power forward-center, and his nickname is "The Beast". He became the first Chinese player to ever sign with a Euroleague club, when he joined the Greek League team Panathinaikos for the 2013-14 season.

College career
After playing high school basketball at Avondale College in Auckland, New Zealand, Shang played college basketball at Illinois Central Community College from 2005 to 2007, at the University of Nebraska, where he played with the Nebraska Cornhuskers from 2007 to 2008, and at Emporia State University from 2008 to 2009.

Professional career
Shang began his pro career with the Beijing Ducks of the Chinese Basketball Association in 2009. In 2010, he moved to the Chinese club Shanxi Brave Dragons, and in 2012 he joined the Chinese club Qingdao Eagles, where he was a teammate of Tracy McGrady.

Shang moved to the Greek League club Panathinaikos in 2013, thus becoming the first Chinese player to ever play in a European basketball league. He returned to China in 2014 and spent the next two seasons with the Tianjin Gold Lions.

Awards and honors

Club career
Greek Cup Champion: (2014)
Greek League Champion: (2014)

References

External links
Euroleague.net Profile
FIBA.com Profile
Eurobasket.com Profile
Draftexpress.com Profile
Scoresway.com Profile
Greek League Profile 
AsianCagers.com Profile
University of Nebraska College Bio
Sports-Reference.com College Stats

1984 births
Living people
Basketball players from Harbin
Chinese men's basketball players
Beijing Ducks players
Centers (basketball)
Chinese expatriate basketball people in Greece
Chinese expatriate basketball people in the United States
Emporia State Hornets basketball players
Illinois Central Cougars men's basketball players
Nebraska Cornhuskers men's basketball players
Panathinaikos B.C. players
Power forwards (basketball)
Qingdao Eagles players
Shanxi Loongs players
Tianjin Pioneers players